Sonqori, also known as Sonqori Turkic, is a Turkic dialect spoken in Sonqor (Sunqur), east of Kermānšāh, in a large valley separated from the rest of Kurdistan.

According to the Turkologist Michael Knüppel, Sonqori is one of the Southern Oghuz dialects of Iran alongside Qashqai and Äynallu. He notes that K. H. Menges had already characterized Sonqori, together with Qashqai and Äynallu, as a transitional form between Azerbaijani and Khorasani Turkic.

Turkologist Gerhard Doerfer identifies Sonqori as a dialect of Azerbaijani. Ethnologue and Glottolog list it as a South Azerbaijani dialect.

Knowledge of the dialect was scant prior to the expeditions of the University of Göttingen.

About 40,000 speakers of Sonqori exist in the Sonqor area.

Phonology

Vowels

References

Literature 
 
 
 

Agglutinative languages
Languages of Iran
Oghuz languages
Azerbaijani language dialects
Turkic languages